This is a list of motion picture distributors, past and present, sorted alphabetically by country.

Albania 
 Constantin Film
 United International Pictures

Argentina 
 Star Distribution
 Warner Bros.
 Sony Pictures
 Fox Distribution Company
 United International Pictures
 Argentina Sono Film
 Artistas Unidos
 Cinema International Corporation
 Columbia Pictures of Argentina
 Lumiton
 Metro-Goldwyn-Mayer (MGM)
 Paramount Pictures
 RKO Radio Pictures de Argentina
 Universal Films Argentina
 Warner-Columbia Films

Australia 
 20th Century Studios/Metro-Goldwyn-Mayer
 Antidote Films
 Film Australia
 Hoyts Distribution/Sony Pictures Releasing
 Leap Frog Films
 Lionsgate Australia
 Madman Entertainment
 Palace Films and Cinemas
 Paramount Pictures/Universal Pictures
 Titan View
 Transmission Films
 Roadshow Films
 Walt Disney Studios Motion Pictures

Brazil 
 Star Distribution
 Warner Bros.
 Sony
 Fox Distribution Company
 Columbia Pictures
 United International Pictures

Canada 
 Alliance Films
 Astral Films
 Brightlight Pictures
 Cinexus/Famous Players (C/FP)
 Elevation Pictures
 Entertainment One
 Malofilm
 Mongrel Media
 Multiple Media Entertainment
 National Film Board of Canada
 Phase 4 Films (owned by Entertainment One)
 Les Films Séville (owned by Entertainment One)
 Teletoon
 Warner Bros.
 VVS Films

China 
 Alibaba Pictures
 August First Film Studio
 Beijing Enlight Pictures
 China Film Group
 DMG Entertainment
 Fantasy Pictures
 Huaxia Film Distribution
 Huayi Brothers
 Le Vision Pictures
 Polybona Films
 Wanda Media

Denmark 
 Nordisk Film
 Buena Vista International Denmark

Finland 
 Finnkino
 SF Film Finland

France 
 AMLF
 BAC Films
 Gaumont
 Metropolitan Filmexport
 Pan-Européenne
 Pathé
 SND Films
 StudioCanal
 UGC
 UGC Fox Distribution
 United International Pictures

Germany and Austria 
 20th Century Studios
 Constantin Film
 Sony Pictures Releasing
Filmdelights
 Filmverlag der Autoren
 Kinowelt
 Tobis
 Sascha-Film
 Senator Film
Stadtkino
 Paramount Pictures Germany/Universal Pictures Germany
 Universum Film
 The Walt Disney Company Austria GmbH
 RKO Radio Pictures GmbH
 Warner Bros.
 Wild Bunch

Hong Kong 
 Cinema City International
 Golden Harvest
 JCE Movies Limited
 Media Asia
 Mei Ah Entertainment
 Shaw Brothers Pictures
 Universe Entertainment

India 
 A For Apple Productions
 AA Films
 Aascar Film Pvt. Ltd
 AVM Productions
 Black Ticket Company
 Dharma Productions
 Eros International
 Excel Entertainment
 Grass Root Film Company
 Kalasangham Films
 Maxlab Cinemas and Entertainments
 Neelam Productions
 PVR Pictures
 Rajshri Productions
 Red Chillies Entertainment
 Red Giant Movies
 Reliance Entertainment
 Sahara Movie Studios
 Shemaroo Entertainment
 Star Studios
 Tips Music Films
 Ultra Media & Entertainment
 UTV Motion Pictures
 Viacom18 Studios
 Yash Raj Films
 YM Movies
 YSR Films
 Zee Studios
 Action Reaction Jenish
 Red Giant Movies

Italy 
 Artex Film
 Artisti Associati
 Cineriz
 De Laurentiis Entertainment Group
 Filmauro
 Lux Film
 Metacinema
 Penta
 Sony Pictures
Titanus
Warner Bros. 
 01 Distribution
 Rai Cinema

Japan 
 Bandai Visual
 Toho
 Toei
 Shochiku
 Kadokawa Shoten

Korea, South 
 CJ Entertainment
 Lotte Entertainment
 Next Entertainment World
 Showbox

Malaysia 
 Golden Screen Cinemas
 Tanjong Golden Village
 MBO Cinemas

Mexico 
 Filmex

Netherlands 
 20th Century Studios
 BBI Films
 Benelux Film Distributors
 Buena Vista International (Germany)
 Fortissimo Films
 Lionsgate International
 Metro-Goldwyn-Mayer
 Paramount Pictures
 Sony Pictures
 Universal Pictures International
 Warner Bros. (Holland)

Nigeria 
 Silverbird Film Distribution

Pakistan 
 A-Plus Films
 ARY Films
 Geo Films
 Hum Films
 Summit Entertainment Pakistan
 Eveready Pictures
 TVOne Films
 Urdu 1 Pictures

Philippines 
 ABS-CBN Film Productions Inc. (d/b/a Star Cinema)
 Crystal Sky Multimedia
 OctoArts Films/Axinite Digicinema
 Paramount Pictures/Sony Pictures Entertainment
 Pioneer Films/Lionsgate Films
 Rafella Films International
 Regal Entertainment/Reality Entertainment
 Solar Pictures
 Viva International Pictures/MVP Entertainment
 Walt Disney Studios Motion Pictures
 Warner Bros./Universal Studios

Portugal
 Castello Lopes
 Lusomundo
 NOS Audiovisuais

Russia 
 Soyuzmultfilm
 Bazelevs Distribution
 Universal Pictures Russia
 Walt Disney Studios/Sony Pictures Releasing
 20th Century Studios
 Caro Premiere/Warner Bros.
 Lenfilm
 Central Partnership/Paramount Pictures
 Mosfilm

Singapore 
 Cathay Organisation
 Golden Village
 Shaw Organisation

Sri Lanka 

 Lyca Production
 Manons cine combine 
 Aiswariya Films

Sweden 
 Buena Vista International
 Lionsgate Sweden
 Metro-Goldwyn-Mayer
 Sandrew Metronome
 Sonet Film
 Sony Pictures
 Svensk Filmindustri
 Svenska Filminstitutet
 20th Century Studios
 United International Pictures
 Warner Bros.

Thailand 
 GDH 559/GMM Tai Hub
 M Pictures
 Sahamongkol Film International
 United International Pictures
 Walt Disney Studios Motion Pictures/20th Century Studios/Sony Pictures Releasing
 Warner Bros.

United Kingdom 

 20th Century Studios Film Co. Ltd.
 Aardman Animations
 Anglo-Amalgamated
 Artificial Eye
 Axiom Films
 Ayngaran International (Tamil films only)
 Brent Walker Film Distributors
 Buena Vista International
 Cannon Distributors (UK)
 Cinema International Corporation (CIC)
 Columbia Pictures
 Columbia TriStar Film Distributors International
 Contender Entertainment Group
 Diffusion Pictures
 Dogwoof Pictures
 Entertainment One
 EMI Films (as a distributor, EMI operated under several names during its involvement in the film industry)
 Entertainment Film Distributors
 Eros International
 Film Four Distributors
 Film Producers Guild
 First Independent Films
 Fremantle
 General Film Distributors
 Guild Film Distribution
 Icon Film Distribution
 ITC Film Distributors
 Journeyman Pictures
 Lionsgate UK
 Metro-Goldwyn-Mayer
 Momentum Pictures
 New World Pictures
 Optimum Releasing
 Paramount Pictures UK
 Park Circus Ltd.
 Pathé
 PolyGram Filmed Entertainment
 Rank Film Distributors
 Redbus Film Distribution
 Revolver Entertainment
 RKO Radio Pictures
 Signature Entertainment
 Soda Pictures
 Summit Entertainment UK (from E1 Entertainment)
 Sony Pictures
 Tartan Films
 United Artists Corp.
 United International Pictures
 Universal Pictures UK
 The Walt Disney Company Ltd.
 Warner-Pathé Distributors Ltd.

United States 

 1091 Pictures
 A24 Films
 American Film Institute (AFI)
 Allied Artists
 American Releasing Corp./American International Pictures
 Anchor Bay Entertainment
 Anywhere Road
 Associated Artists Productions
 Astor Pictures
 Avco Embassy Pictures
 Biograph Studios
 Brain Damage Films
 Buena Vista
 Cannon Releasing Corp.
 CBS Films
 Cinemation Industries
 Cinerama Releasing Corp.
 Cineville
 Columbia Pictures
 Commonwealth United Entertainment
 Continental Distributing (A Division Of Walter Reade-Sterling Inc.)
 Crown International Pictures
 Distributors Corporation of America (DCA)
 Dominant Pictures Corporation
 Eagle Lion Films Inc.
 Eagle Lion Classics Inc.
 Embassy Pictures
 Eternal Pictures
 Fairway Film Alliance
 Famous Players Film Company
 Famous Players-Lasky Corporation
 Films Around The World
 First Run Features
 First Independent Pictures
 First National
 Fortune Features
 Fox Film Corporation
 Gaumont British Picture Corp. of America
 Genius Products
 Global Film Initiative
 Goldwyn Pictures
 Grand National Pictures
 Gravitas Ventures
 Hallmark Productions
 Hal Roach Studios
 Hannover House
 Howco Productions/Howco-International Pictures
 IFC Films
 Janus Films
 KDK Factory
 Kinemacolor
 Koch-Lorber Films
 Liberty Films
 Lionsgate
 Lippert Pictures
 Lopert Films
 Magnolia Pictures
 Majestic Pictures
 Mascot Pictures
 Maxim Media Marketing, Inc.
 Metro-Goldwyn-Mayer (MGM)
 Metro Pictures
 Metropolitan Pictures Corporation
 Micheaux Film Corp.
 Milestone Films
 Millennium Films
 Monogram Pictures
 Mutual Film Corporation
 Myriad Pictures
 Music Box Films
 National General Pictures
 N. T. A. Pictures Inc./Republic Pictures (#2)
 Newmarket Films
 Norton, Frank
 Oscilloscope
 Overture Films
 Pacific International Enterprises
 Palm Pictures
 Paramount Pictures
 Pathe Exchanges Inc.
 Peter Rodgers Organization (PRO)
 Phaedra Cinema
 Phase 4 Films
 Picturehouse
 Powers Pictures Inc.
 Prizma Color
 Producers Distributing Corporation (PDC)
 Producers Releasing Corporation (PRC)
 RKO Radio Pictures
 Rank Film Distributors of America Inc.
 Realart Pictures
 Republic Pictures (#1)
 Roadside Attractions
 Roc Nation
 Rogue Arts
 Rogue Pictures
 STX Entertainment
 The Samuel Goldwyn Company
 Screen Guild Productions Inc.
 Selznick International Pictures
 The Solax Company
 Sono Art-World Wide Pictures
 Sony Pictures
 Strand Releasing
 Striped Entertainment
 Technicolor
 Thanhouser Company
 The Weinstein Company
 THINKFilm
 Tiffany Studios
 Trans-Lux
 Transatlantic Pictures
 Triangle Film Corporation
 Troma Entertainment
 20th Century Studios
 Twentieth Century Pictures
 Ufa Film Co.
 United Artists
 Universal Pictures
 Victory Pictures Corporation
 Vitagraph Studios
 Vitaphone
 Walt Disney Studios Motion Pictures
 Warner Bros.
 Western Film Exchange
 Women Make Movies
 World Wide Motion Pictures Corp.
 World Wide Pictures Inc.
 Yari Film Group
 Zeitgeist Films

Vietnam
 CJ CGV

West Asia/North Africa 
 General Organization for Cinema (Syria)
 Gulf Film
 Rotana

References 

 
Distributors
Film distribution